Shinsukki Blues is a 2004 South Korean film about a smarmy corporate lawyer who magically switches bodies with a pro bono defense attorney with the same name. It was the last Korean film released to theaters in 2004.

External links
Official website

2004 films
2000s Korean-language films
South Korean romantic comedy films
2000s South Korean films